Nemsadze is a Georgian surname. Notable people with the surname include:

 Georgi Nemsadze (born 1972), Georgian footballer and manager
 Giorgi Nemsadze (born 1984), Georgian rugby union player
 Oto Nemsadze (born 1989), Georgian singer

Georgian-language surnames